Alexandra "Allie" MacDonald (born September 17, 1988) is a Canadian actress.

Early life
MacDonald was born in Antigonish, Nova Scotia, Canada, to parents Peter and Chrissy MacDonald. She studied musical theatre at the Canadian College of Performing Arts in Victoria, British Columbia.

Career
She made her feature film debut as Eve in Score: A Hockey Musical (2010). She has appeared in independent films, short films and television shows. She starred in the films The Barrens (2012), House at the End of the Street (2012), And Now a Word from Our Sponsor (2013), the horror-musical film, Stage Fright (2014), and the neonoir film Under the Silver Lake (2018).

Her most notable television roles are Belinda McKay in the Canadian comedy Young Drunk Punk. and Trina on Orphan Black. She appeared as Edie Soames in the CTV mini-series Cardinal.

She released her debut EP 'Thank You' on December 20, 2016, under the pseudonym Sureilla.

Filmography

Film

Television

References

External links

1988 births
20th-century Canadian actresses
21st-century Canadian actresses
21st-century Canadian women singers
Best Supporting Actress in a Drama Series Canadian Screen Award winners
Canadian film actresses
Canadian television actresses
Canadian women singers
Living people
People from Antigonish, Nova Scotia